Upper Kurram Tehsil is a subdivision located in Kurram District, Khyber Pakhtunkhwa, Pakistan. The population is 253,478 according to the 2017 census.

History 

In 2014, Upper Kurram's Assistant Political Agent Maqsood Hassan was arrested by the National Accountability Bureau on corruption charges.

In November 2017, a US drone strike was carried out on a house in Ghozgarhy, Upper Kurram. This action was condemned by the Foreign Office. Four people were killed in this strike.

Geography

Adjacent administrative units 
Sherzad District, Nangarhar Province, Afghanistan (north)
Khogyani District, Nangarhar Province, Afghanistan (northeast)
Pachir Aw Agam District, Nangarhar Province, Afghanistan (northeast)
Central Kurram F.R. (east)
Lower Kurram Tehsil (southeast)
Zazi Maidan District, Khost Province, Afghanistan (southwest)
Dand Aw Patan District, Paktia Province, Afghanistan (southwest)
Zazi District, Paktia Province, Afghanistan (west)

Demographics 

Upper Kurram is predominantly Shiite.

See also 
 Parachinar
 List of tehsils of Khyber Pakhtunkhwa

References 

Tehsils of Khyber Pakhtunkhwa
Populated places in Kurram District